Jan Vodháněl (born 25 April 1997) is a Czech professional footballer who plays as a midfielder for Sigma Olomouc.

Club career
He made his senior league debut for FK Mladá Boleslav on 9 April 2016 in a Czech First League 2–2 home draw against Dukla Prague.

In December 2021, Vodháněl signed a long-term contract with Admira Wacker in Austria. He left the club in July 2022 after relegation from the Austrian Football Bundesliga.

In July 2022, Vodháněl signed a two-year contract with Sigma Olomouc.

References

External links 
 
 
 Jan Vodháněl profile on the FK Mladá Boleslav official website
 National Team profile

1997 births
Sportspeople from Mladá Boleslav
Living people
Czech footballers
Association football midfielders
Czech Republic youth international footballers
FK Mladá Boleslav players
FK Pardubice players
Bohemians 1905 players
FC Admira Wacker Mödling players
Czech First League players
Czech National Football League players
Austrian Football Bundesliga players
Czech expatriate footballers
Expatriate footballers in Austria
Czech expatriate sportspeople in Austria
SK Sigma Olomouc players
FC Sellier & Bellot Vlašim players